Martina Criscio (24 January 1994 in Foggia) is an Italian fencer, specialist of sabre.

She won the gold medal at World Championships of Leipzig 2017, with the Italian team.  She competed at the 2020 Summer Olympics, in Sabre.

References

External links

 Profile at the European Fencing Confederation
Profile at the Italian Fencing Federation

1994 births
Living people
Italian female fencers
Italian sabre fencers
Sportspeople from Foggia
Fencers at the 2015 European Games
European Games medalists in fencing
European Games silver medalists for Italy
Fencers at the 2020 Summer Olympics
Olympic fencers of Italy
20th-century Italian women
21st-century Italian women